INS Eilat may refer to:

 , a cruising class gunboat, built in 1927, commissioned into the Israel Navy in 1948 as INS Eilat, renamed Matzpen in 1955, and scrapped in 1962
 , a Z-class destroyer, built in 1944, commissioned into the Israel Navy in 1955 as INS Eilat, sunk by Egypt in 1967
 , a Sa'ar 2-class missile boat, commissioned in 1969
  first of three Sa'ar 5-class corvettes of the Israel Navy, built in 1993

Israeli Navy ship names